In Slavic folklore, the rusalka (plural: rusalky/rusalki;) is a typically feminine entity, often malicious toward mankind and frequently associated with water, with counterparts in other parts of Europe, such as the French Melusine and the Germanic Nixie. Folklorists have proposed a variety of origins for the entity, including that they may originally stem from Slavic paganism, where they may have been seen as benevolent spirits. Rusalki appear in a variety of media in modern popular culture, particularly in Slavic language-speaking countries, where they frequently resemble the concept of the mermaid.

In northern Russia, the rusalka was also known by various names such as the vodyanitsa (or vodyaniha/vodyantikha; ; lit. "she from the water" or "the water maiden"), kupalka ("bather"), shutovka ("joker", "jester" or "prankster") and loskotukha (or shchekotukha, shchekotunya; ; "tickler" or "she who tickles"). In Ukraine, the rusalka was called a mavka. Those names were more common until the 20th century, and the word rusalka was perceived by many people as bookish, scholarly.

Etymology
The term "rusalka" derives from "rusalija" which entered Slavic languages, via Byzantine Greek "rousália", from the Latin "Rosālia" as a name for Pentecost and the days adjacent to it. Long-standing, likely pre-Christian, annual traditions resulted in that time of year being associated with spirits (navki, mavki) which were subsequently named for the holiday.

Origin and appearance

According to Vladimir Propp, the original "rusalka" was an appellation used by pagan Slavic peoples, who linked them with fertility and did not consider rusalki evil before the 19th century. They came out of the water in the spring to transfer life-giving moisture to the fields and thus helped nurture the crops.

In 19th-century versions, a rusalka is an unquiet, dangerous being who is no longer alive, associated with the unclean spirit. According to Dmitry Zelenin, young women, who either committed suicide by drowning due to an unhappy marriage (they might have been jilted by their lovers or abused and harassed by their much older husbands) or who were violently drowned against their will (especially after becoming pregnant with unwanted children), must live out their designated time on Earth as rusalki. However, the initial Slavic lore suggests that not all rusalki occurrences were linked with death from water.

It is accounted by most stories that the soul of a young woman who had died in or near a river or a lake would come back to haunt that waterway. This undead rusalka is not invariably malevolent, and would be allowed to die in peace if her death is avenged. Her main purpose is, however, to lure young men, seduced by either her looks or her voice, into the depths of said waterways where she would entangle their feet with her long hair and submerge them. Her body would instantly become very slippery and not allow the victim to cling on to her body in order to reach the surface. She would then wait until the victim had drowned, or, on some occasions, tickle them to death, as she laughed. It is also believed, by a few accounts, that rusalki can change their appearance to match the tastes of men they are about to seduce, although a rusalka is generally considered to represent universal beauty, therefore is highly feared yet respected in Slavic culture.

In most beliefs rusalki always have loose hair, which can be linked to Slavic traditions of unwedded maidens having unbraided or loosely braided hair which, once married, is tightly braided and worn under a headdress.  According to Dal's Explanatory Dictionary, the expression "Walks like a rusalka" is applied to girls with unkempt hair. The hair of the rusalka can be fair, black, greenish or completely green. An important attribute of the water maiden is the comb, usually made from fish bones.

Variations

While lore often says that the rusalki could not completely stand out of water, some fiction works tell of rusalki that could climb trees and sing songs, sit on docks with only submerged feet and comb their hair, or even join other rusalki in circle dances in the field. A particular feature of such stories revolves around the fact that this behaviour would be limited to only certain periods of the year, usually the summer (see Rusalka Week section).

Region-specific
Specifics pertaining to rusalki differed among regions. In most tales they lived without men. In stories from Ukraine, they were often linked with water. In Belarus they were linked with the forest and field. They were usually pictured as beautiful naked maidens, but in some areas they were imagined as hideous and hairy. They were said to tickle men to death. According to some Russian beliefs, rusalki had the appearance of very pale little girls with green hair and long arms. In other beliefs, they were described as naked girls with light brown hair.

In Poland and Czech Republic, water rusalki/rusalky were younger and fair-haired, while the forest ones looked more mature and had black hair – but in both cases, if someone looked up close, their hair turned green, and the faces became distorted. They killed their victims by tickling them to death or forcing them to participate in a frenzied dance. In Polish folklore, the term rusalka could also stand for boginka, dziwożona and various other entities.

Rusalka week

The rusalki were believed to be at their most dangerous during the 'Rusalka week' in early June. At this time, they were supposed to have left their watery depths in order to swing on branches of birch and willow trees by night. Swimming during this week was strictly forbidden, lest mermaids would drag a swimmer down to the river bed. A common feature of the celebration of Rusalnaya was the ritual banishment or burial of the rusalki at the end of the week, which remained as entertainment in Russia, Belarus, and Ukraine until the 1930s.

Known rusalki
Dana. A vodyanitsa mentioned in Russian folktale. Her wicked stepmother envied her beauty. Once they went to swim near the water mill, and the stepmother drowned Dana. Dana had a groom, a young knyaz. He longed for his late bride, and often came to the place of her death. One day he stayed late into the night, and saw how beautiful maidens began to jump on the mill wheels, laughing and combing their long green hair with white combs. Seeing Dana among them, the knyaz rushed to her, but the rusalka had already jumped into the water. The knyaz dived after her, but got entangled in her hair, falling into the underwater palace.  Dana told him to get out as soon as possible if he wanted to return, otherwise it would be too late and he would die.  The groom replied that he could not live without her and would not go anywhere. Dana kissed him, after which he became the water king of that river.

Kostroma. A spring-summer ritual character, as well as a fertility goddess associated with rusalkas and mavkas. According to myth, she drowned herself in a lake when she discovered that her newlywed husband, Kupalo, was her brother. She lured every man who met her into the watery abyss. Later, the gods took pity on the rusalka, and turned her and Kupalo into a single flower.

Marina. A young widow from the old Simbirsk legend who drowned herself in the river Volga out of love for Ivan Curchaviy and became a rusalka. It was said that she was able to take the form of a swan when she swam. She was also spotted flipping boats along with a vodyanoy named Volnok. Marina often sat on the shore, sadly looking at the house of her lover, who had married another girl. As a result, she managed to charm Ivan and take him under the water, where they began to live happily.

Moryana. The sea vodyanitsa and the daughter of the Morskoy Tsar. She was usually described as an incredibly beautiful, often very tall maiden with disheveled hair that looked like sea foam. Most of the time she swam deep in the waters, taking the form of a fish, and came ashore only at the evenings. She was also believed to be the ruler of the sea winds. She could be either good or bad, eliminating storms in the first case and causing them in the second. Sometimes the marine species of vodyanitsy in general were named after her.

Modern popular culture
Regarding representations of the rusalka in modern popular culture, folklorist Natalie Kononenko says, "the currently dominant presents her as something like a mermaid, though she is pictured as having legs rather than a fish tail ... The current view of the rusalka as a seductive or seduced woman was probably influenced by written literature. In the past, her image was more complex and she more closely resembled a nature spirit, found not only near water but in fields, forests, and mountains, rather like the vila ...".

List of notable works featuring rusalki
 1829 – "Rusalka" is a short story of Orest Somov (translated into English and published in 2016).
 1831 – Rusalka is a poem by Mikhail Lermontov.
 1856 – Rusalka is an opera by Alexander Dargomyzhsky.
 1895 – Roussalka is an unfinished opera by Henri Duparc.
 1901 – Rusalka is an opera by Antonín Dvořák.
 1902 – The Russalka Memorial is a monument in Tallinn, to mark the anniversary of the sinking of the Russian warship Rusalka in 1893. The bronze sculpture depicts an angel pointing her orthodox cross towards the shipwreck site.
 1908 – Su Anasy (tat. Су анасы; literary Water Mother, in Russian translation Vodyanaya) is a poem by Tatar poet Ğabdulla Tuqay.
 1930s – In his poem, Rus ken nisht ontshlofn vern, Yiddish poet Itzik Manger re-imagines the biblical Ruth in early 20th Century Russia. The night before Naomi's departure, Ruth decides that if her mother-in-law does not take her with, she will throw herself in the river and become a rusalka.
 1943 – Nikolai Medtner's Third Piano Concerto is based on Mikhail Lermontov's ballad.
 1979 – The Merman's Children by Poul Anderson had a Rusalka as the lover of one of the main characters.
 1989 – Rusalka, a fantasy novel, part of The Rusalka trilogy of novels by C. J. Cherryh features and revolves around a rusalka named Eveshka.
 1990 - Tigana by Guy Gavriel Kay, in which riselka, the supernatural creature, which occurrence suggests the future, is inspired by rusalka
 1991 – The Boat House by Stephen Gallagher, a novel in which a Rusalka flees her homeland and attempts to settle in the English Lakes.
 1993 – The Last Wish by Andrzej Sapkowski, a Polish novel from the Witcher series, in which Geralt briefly believes he has encountered a rusalka that has fallen in love with a cursed man; however, the Rusalka turns out to be a bruxa, instead.
 1996 – Rusalka, a short film directed by Aleksandr Petrov, shown in Petrov's Paint-on-glass animation technique.
 1996 – "To This Water (Johnstown, Pennsylvania 1889)", a short story by Caitlín R. Kiernan.
 1999 - 2015 – In some Slavic localizations of the American computer game series Heroes of Might and Magic, various entities are named after rusalka. In the Polish localizations of the third, fifth, and seventh games in the series, as well as Might and Magic VII, "sprites" are renamed to "rusałka", whereas in the Russian localizations of the third, fourth, sixth, and seventh games, as well as Might and Magic X, "mermaids" are renamed to "русалка".
 2004 – "Omut", a concept ethno-ambient-dub album by Ethnica Music Project, based on Russian folk songs about rusalki.
 2005 – The Rusalka Cycle: Songs Between the Worlds is a performance piece and CD by the California-based women's vocal group Kitka.
 2016 – The Book of Speculation: A Novel, Erika Swyler's debut, features rusalka characters in traveling circuses.
 2017 – Rusalka Pictures is a British independent feature film production company.
 2017 – In Katherine Arden's debut novel The Bear and the Nightingale the protagonist, Vasya, befriends a rusalka living in a lake.
 2018 – The Mermaid: Lake of the Dead, a horror film about a rusalka who falls in love with a man and places a curse on him.
 2021 - RUZALKA, a choreographic piece by Copenhagen-based choreographer Thjerza Balaj.

In popular culture

1980 – A rusalka is featured in Poul Anderson's The Merman's Children.
1993 – In the book The Last Wish, by Andrzej Sapkowski, which chronicles the adventures of The Witcher, Geralt of Rivia, The monster he meets in the book’s second  story has a love interest in a Rusalka.
1993 – Quest for Glory: Shadows of Darkness, which draws upon Slavic mythology, features a Rusalka; Paladin characters have the option to avenge her murder and let her move on to the afterlife.
2006 – A cycle of creatures in the trading card game, Magic: the Gathering called Rusalka are printed in the Guildpact expansion.
2007 – The visual novel Dies Irae features a witch under the name Rusalka who, in a chapter that also references the Pied Piper of Hamelin, uses a spell to lure the local students to their demise.
2008 – In the video game Devil May Cry 4 a demon called Ba'el has two angler fish-like glowing feelers called Rusalka, they are used to entice human prey and resemble young, nubile women.
2008 – In the video game Castlevania: Order of Ecclesia, a Rusalka appears as the fifth boss, shown as an aquatic demon.
2012 – Rusalka is the name of a water nymph-like boss fought in the Nintendo 3DS video game Bravely Default.
2013 – Rusalkas appear as monsters in the action role-playing video game The Incredible Adventures of Van Helsing
2015 – Rusalka is the name of a number of beings in video game Axiom Verge.  In in-game dialogue, one rusalka translates this designation as a "water machine".
2015 - Rusalka is the name of an episode in Season 2 episode 3 of Madam Secretary. 
2016 – Rusalka is used in Ultraman Orb as the name of a fictionalized Russia where Ultraman Orb's 1908 battle with Maga-Zetton caused the Tunguska event.
2018 – Rusalkas feature in The Surface Breaks, a YA novel by Louise O'Neill, a retelling of Hans Christian Andersen's 1857 story "The Little Mermaid".
2018 – In the film The Bastard Sword the protagonist Tias encounters a Rusalka who guides him on his journey to find The Sword.
2018 – Rusalka, Rusalka / Wild Rushes, on The Decemberists album I'll Be Your Girl.

See also

References

Further reading
 Hilton, Alison. Russian folk art. Indiana University Press, 1995. .
 Д.К. Зеленин. Очерки русской мифологии: Умершие неестественною смертью и русалки. Москва: Индрик. 1995.

External links
 

Nav'
Russian folklore characters
Slavic folklore
Water spirits
Female legendary creatures
Slavic folklore characters
Piscine and amphibian humanoids